Simon Gillham (born 24 February 1956 in Letchworth Garden City) is a member of Vivendi’s Management Board as well as the co-owner and chairman of the professional French rugby team Club athlétique Brive Corrèze Limousin (Top 14). He is Chairman of Vivendi Village, and Senior Executive Vice president - Communications for Vivendi. He is the father of 4 Franco-British children.

Life

Career
Simon Gillham holds a Bachelor of Arts degree from the University of Sussex and a postgraduate degree in Education from the University of Bristol.

He started his career at Thomson in 1981 as a language training specialist. In 1985, he created a training and communications company: York Consultants. In 1991, he was appointed Communications Vice-President at Thomson Consumer Electronics. In 1994, he joined the CarnaudMetalbox group. In early 1999, Simon Gillham was appointed V-P Communications of the Valeo Group, before being appointed as Havas Communications Vice-President in April 2001. He joined Vivendi in 2007 as Communications and Sustainable Development Senior Vice President.

Since 2007, he has been Executive Vice-President - Communications Vivendi, as well as Chairman of Vivendi Village. Vivendi Village is a Vivendi subsidiary specialized in live entertainment, ticketing and venues, including such entities as See Tickets, Copyrights Group and U-Live in the United Kingdom , L'Olympia, Théâtre de l'Oeuvre, CanalOlympia (venues in Africa) and Olympia Production.

Through Vivendi Village, Simon Gillham is behind the development of a range of regional festivals particularly in France, such as the Brive Festival, Les Déferlantes Sud de France and Garorock.

In 2010, Simon Gillham was appointed Officer of the British Empire by Queen Elizabeth II.

He was appointed to the Vivendi Management Board in November 2015.

Rugby
In 2007, he was appointed CEO of CA Brive Corrèze Limousin by then club owner, Daniel Derichebourg. In 2009, he acquired the club “with some friends”. In November 2016, Simon Gillham replaced Jean-Jacques Bertrand as club Chairman. CA Brive Corrèze Limousin currently competes in the French elite division, Top 14.

Notes and references 

1956 births
Living people
Businesspeople from Paris
Rugby union officials
Alumni of the University of Sussex
Alumni of the University of Bristol
Officers of the Order of the British Empire